Mario Chella (16 March 1934 – 13 July 2022) was an Italian politician. He served as a member of the Chamber of Deputies of Italy from 1983 to 1992. Chella died in July 2022, at the age of 88.

References 

1934 births
2022 deaths
Deputies of Legislature IX of Italy
Deputies of Legislature X of Italy
Italian Communist Party politicians
Democratic Party of the Left politicians
Democrats of the Left politicians
20th-century Italian politicians
21st-century Italian politicians